Loxostege oblinalis is a moth in the family Crambidae. It was described by Cajetan Felder, Rudolf Felder and Alois Friedrich Rogenhofer in 1875. It is found in the Democratic Republic of the Congo and South Africa.

References

Moths described in 1875
Pyraustinae